Craig J. Newschaffer is the founding director of Drexel University's AJ Drexel Autism Institute, as well as a professor of epidemiology at the Drexel University School of Public Health and a professor of psychology at Drexel University College of Medicine.

Education
Newschaffer holds bachelor's degrees in biology and public relations from Boston University (1984), a SM in Health Policy and Management from the Harvard University School of Public Health and a PhD in chronic disease epidemiology from Johns Hopkins University (1996).

Career
Newschaffer was formerly assistant professor of epidemiology at the Johns Hopkins Bloomberg School of Public Health's Center for Autism and Developmental Disabilities from 2004 until he was appointed professor of public health at Drexel in 2007.

Research
Newschaffer is the principal director of the "EARLI" study, which follows mothers of children with autism beginning at the start of subsequent pregnancies, given that these mothers are known to be at a higher risk of having another autistic child, and has been the principal investigator of the ADDM Network and the SEED study. Newschaffer serves as associate editor of the American Journal of Epidemiology.

Views on autism causes
With regard to the causes of autism, Newschaffer stated in an interview that while genetics plays an important role, that "there are going to be causal components that are nonheritable genetics, things that we refer to as environmental causes..." He has also, however, contended that the rise in autism prevalence is to a large extent due only to "increased community awareness, changes to the diagnostic approach among clinicians and shifting public policy," though he was more ambiguous about this in a 2005 interview, saying that he thought that "there currently is little strong evidence supporting either hypothesis (real risk versus diagnostic bias)...," a view he had expressed the previous year in an interview with The New York Times , saying that "a large chunk" of the rise in autism was due to broadening of the diagnostic criteria but that "The devil is in how big a chunk is that big chunk." Newschaffer has also contended that there is no link between vaccines and autism, saying, "Those studies just kept piling up that showed no association between MMR or thimerosal exposure and autism."

References

Autism researchers
Drexel University faculty
Harvard School of Public Health alumni
Johns Hopkins Bloomberg School of Public Health alumni
Living people
Boston University alumni
Year of birth missing (living people)